Pwllheli Corporation Tramways operated a short horse-drawn tramway service in Pwllheli, Gwynedd, Wales. It had between 1899 and 1919.

History

The short horse-drawn tramway service from Pwllheli railway station to Victoria Parade operated a summer service. It opened on 24 July 1899 when over 1,000 tickets were purchased. The tramway was built by the workmen of the Corporation and consisted of a single line with a passing loop at the centre. It was built to a gauge of 2 ft 6in. The Corporation provided open and covered cars. The open one had reversible seats for 24 passengers, and the closed one could accommodate 16 passengers. The fare was 1d., with special workmen's fares of 1/2 d.

Proposals were put forwards for a connection to the Pwllheli and Llanbedrog Tramway, but these were never advanced, presumably, one of the major issues was the difference in track gauge.

Closure

The service ceased after the summer season in 1919. It was dismantled shortly afterwards.

References

Tram transport in Wales
2 ft 6 in gauge railways in Wales